Chain propagation (sometimes referred to as propagation) is a process in which a reactive intermediate is continuously regenerated during the course of a chemical chain reaction. For example, in the chlorination of methane, there is a two-step propagation cycle involving as chain carriers a chlorine atom and a methyl radical which are regenerated alternately:
•Cl + CH4 → HCl + •CH3 
•CH3 + Cl2 → CH3Cl + •Cl
The two steps add to give the equation for the overall chain reaction:
CH4 + Cl2 → CH3Cl + HCl.

Polymerization
In a chain-growth polymerization reaction, the reactive end-groups of a polymer chain react in each propagation step with a new monomer molecule transferring the reactive group to the last unit. Here the chain carrier is the polymer molecule with a reactive end-group, and at each step it is regenerated with the addition of one monomer unit:

External links
 IUPAC Gold Book definition: chain-propagating reaction

References 

Chemical reactions
Polymer chemistry